Shaylee is a feminine given name of Gaelic origin. The name means "admirable" and is related to the Irish name Shea.

Other alternate variant(s) of the name is/are Shayla and Shayle.

This name can be also an anglicized version of the Hebrew name Shaili, a combination of the names Shai and Li, which gives the meaning of "gift for me". 

Notable people with the name include:

 Shaylee Bent (born 2000), an Australian rugby league footballer
 Shaylee Chuckulnaskit (2000–2014), a victim of the Marysville Pilchuck High School shooting
 Shaylee Curnow (born 1998), Australian singer and songwriter known professionally as Peach PRC
 Shaylee Mansfield (born 2009), deaf American actress and YouTuber

See also
 Shae (given name)
 Shea (disambiguation)

References

Feminine given names